The Journal of Drug and Alcohol Research is a monthly peer-reviewed open-access medical journal covering addiction, addiction psychology, alcoholism, biopharmaceutics, pharmaceutical chemistry, pharmacognosy, pharmacology, a,d clinical and biomedical sciences. It is published by Ashdin Publishing, which was listed on Beall's list of predatory publishers before it was taken down in 2017.

Abstracting and indexing
The journal is abstracted and indexed in Embase and Scopus.

References

External links

Creative Commons Attribution-licensed journals
Monthly journals
English-language journals
Pharmacology journals
Publications established in 2012
2012 establishments in Egypt
Addiction medicine journals